How to Survive a Marriage is an American soap opera which aired on the NBC television network from January 7, 1974 to April 18, 1975. The serial was created by Anne Howard Bailey, with much input from then-NBC Vice President Lin Bolen. The show's working title was From This Moment and was an in-house NBC production.

A total of 332 episodes were produced (255 in its first season, and 77 in its final season).

Synopsis
Larry and his wife Christine (nicknamed "Chris," played by Jennifer Harmon) soon divorced and while battling for custody of their daughter Lori, Chris entered the workforce. On Valentine's Day 1975, Chris and Larry remarried, and she then battled alcoholism.

Initially, the show featured veteran soap actress Rosemary Prinz in the role of Dr. Julie Franklin, a staunch feminist who counseled her friends on the joys of being an independent woman, only to decide that her life was truly complete by marrying a man. Prinz only agreed to stay on the show for a short time (as she had with All My Children several years earlier), and earned top billing, a three-day work week, and supposedly $1,000 an episode, which was a big salary for a soap actress to earn in the 1970s. After six months Julie left town to marry Dr. Tony DeAngelo.

Another major story centered on Fran Bachman (Fran Brill) coping with sudden widowhood. Brill received over a thousand letters of condolence from viewers.

Ratings and cancellation
The show did not profit from the large lead-in that the high-rated Another World provided, mostly due to its many attempts to be socially relevant, which usually took the place of traditional storytelling to which American soap viewers at the time were acclimated. How to Survive a Marriage ran a distant third in the 3:30 p.m. timeslot, behind Match Game on CBS (then daytime TV's highest-rated program) and One Life to Live on ABC; a move to 1:30 p.m. on January 6, 1975 after the cancellation of the original version of the famed game Jeopardy! (it was done to enable Another World to expand to an hour) only brought worse ratings, as it faced two longtime favorites on the competing networks, CBS' As the World Turns which was expanded to an hour (11 months later) and ABC's Let's Make a Deal. Despite NBC's high hopes for How to Survive a Marriage  it would only last on the air for sixteen months, ending on a Thursday (the 1:30–3:00 p.m. block on NBC was preempted the following day for a 90-minute special, First Ladies' Diaries: Rachel Jackson). The Monday after, Days of Our Lives expanded to an hour and assumed the vacant half hour left in NBC's daytime schedule.

How to Survive a Marriage thus holds a rather dubious distinction as not only the first soap opera to become a victim of the first daytime serial, its sister NBC soap Another World, expanding to a full hour, but the second one as well, Days of Our Lives. Numerous other existing serials on ABC and CBS would expand to 60 minutes daily over the next five years or so, cutting down on the number of open 30-minute timeslots available, meaning few if any serials could be launched. This was a strategy employed to minimize risks of new 30-minute shows like How to Survive a Marriage failing to develop an audience in a timely enough manner to suit the networks and advertisers; several other serials had been canceled over the previous several years due to that issue, including How to Survive a Marriages two predecessors.

Cast
Fran Brill is now best-known for her work on Sesame Street, where she performed Muppet characters, including Zoe and Prairie Dawn, from 1970 to 2014.

Other cast members included Ken Kercheval (Larry Kirby #2), F. Murray Abraham (Joshua Browne), Armand Assante (Johnny McGhee), and Brad Davis (Alexander Kronos).

Awards and nominations
The serial won Best Sequence at the third annual Afternoon TV Writers & Editors Awards, for "The Death of David Bachman." Fran Brill also won an award from the Afternoon TV Writers & Editors for her portrayal of Fran Bachman during the same award-winning sequence.

References

External links
 

American television soap operas
NBC original programming
1974 American television series debuts
1975 American television series endings
English-language television shows